Albidella is a genus of plants in the Alismataceae. At the present time (May 2014), only one species is known, Albidella nymphaeifolia, formerly called Echinodorus nymphaeifolius. It is native to Cuba and the Yucatán Peninsula (Belize, Guatemala, Campeche, Quintana Roo, and Yucatán State).

Etymology
Albidella is a taxonomic anagram derived from the name of the confamilial genus Baldellia. The latter name is a taxonomic patronym honoring the Italian nobleman Bartolomea Bartoloni-Baldelli.

Description
Leaves are variable; one plant can develop 2 - 3 stems of different types simultaneously. Submersed leaves short-petiolate, blades long, lanceolate to linear, light-green, membranously transparent, 15 – 25 cm long x 0.8 - 1.8 cm wide, obtuse at the point, decurrent to the markedly winged petiole at the base. Their margins are undulate to curled, sometimes narrowly parallel, another time the blades broaden towards the apex and are widest in the upper third showing club-shaped form. Floating or emersed leaves are 25 – 35 cm long, long-petioled, blades oval or ovate with conspicuous lobes, which touch and / or cover each other. Blades and lobes inclusively 6 – 12 cm long x 5 – 8 cm wide, the length of the central rib usually being the same as the width of the blade. In the blade there are, some distance from each other, clear, short and longer pellucid lines reaching a length of 0.2 - 0.3 mm. Sterile plants look very similar to Echinodorus berteroi.

This genus markedly differs from Echinodorus by a typical paniculate inflorescence shaped as a regular pyramid. Flowering stalk is 40 – 50 cm tall, inflorescence up to 12 – 20 cm long, flowers arranged in 2 - 6 whorls, bracts of the lower whorl reach a length of 2.5 – 4 cm and a width of 0.5 - 0.8 cm, bracts in further whorls being only 2 – 5 mm long.  Corolla white, stamens usually 9. Compound fruit comprises maximum 20 achenes, each 1.4 - 1.6 mm long x 1 mm wide with a broad crested keel and with crested ribs and 1 or 2 long glands on each face, beak 0.2 mm long.

References

External links
 Herbarium specimen - Belize
 photo of herbarium specimen at Missouri Botanical Garden, collected Cuba in the 1860s, isolectotype of Alisma nymphaeifolium hence also of Albidella nymphaeifolia
 photo of herbarium specimen at Natural History Museum (London), collected Cuba in the 1860s, isolectotype of Alisma nymphaeifolium hence also of Albidella nymphaeifolia 
 Encyclopedia of Life
   Photos of Albidella nymphaeifolia

Alismataceae
Monotypic Alismatales genera
Flora of Cuba
Flora of Belize
Flora of Guatemala
Flora of Campeche
Flora of Quintana Roo
Flora of Yucatán
Aquatic plants